Coral Throne is the first full-length album by Canadian progressive metal band Mandroid Echostar. The album won the Juno Award for Metal/Hard Music Album of the Year at the Juno Awards of 2017.

Track listing

References

2016 albums
Mandroid Echostar albums